Ian Steven Lustick (born 1949) is an American political scientist and specialist on the modern history and politics of the Middle East. He currently holds the Bess W. Heyman Chair in the department of Political Sciences at the University of Pennsylvania.

Early life and education
Lustick was born in 1949 in Syracuse, New York. His father was a pediatrician and, eager to get out of the 'rat race' of metropolitan life, the family moved to the northern rural area of Jefferson County's Watertown, where his grandfather, unusually for a Jew, was a farmer.  Lustick likened conditions there to those of a shtetl, and he was occasionally the object of anti-Semitic harassment, though the family had a strong sense of patriotic attachment to the country, typical of Jewish immigrants of European background. On graduating from high school, he went on to Brandeis University, arriving in 1967 just as a countercultural wave of student activism was sweeping higher centres of learning.

He completed his Ph.D. at the University of California, Berkeley in 1976 with a dissertation titled Arabs in the Jewish State: a study in the effective control of a minority population later adapted for a book of that title, published in 1980. He spent 1979-1980 as an analyst, specializing in the problems of Israel's occupation of the Palestinian territories, for the Bureau of Intelligence and Research of the Department of State, leaving in the summer of 1980 to return to academia.

Professional career 
He was subsequently appointed professor of government at Dartmouth College, where he taught for 15 years. He then took up a Chair of the Political Science Department at the University of Pennsylvania, where he held the Richard L. Simon Term Professor in the Social Sciences. At present Lustick is the Bess W. Heyman Professor of Political Science at the University of Pennsylvania.

He is a founder and past president of the Association for Israel Studies and past president of the American Political Science Association-Politics and History Section. Lustick became more broadly known with the publication of his book Trapped in the War on Terror (2006) in which he argues that the War on Terrorism is an irrational policy for fighting America's enemies. He argues that this policy was initially conceived of by a neo-conservative cabal at the Project for a New American Century who were determined to shift the direction of U.S. foreign policy towards unilateralism. Given a number of political features unique to the US system, Lustick concluded, the War on Terror has ultimately turned into something beyond anyone's control.

He has engaged in research involving applications of evolutionary and complexity theory to the development of computer simulations using agent-based models for research and policy analysis. Between 2010 and the present day, Lustick has returned to some prominence by writing articles that variously called for Israel to negotiate with Hamas over the future of the area and said that the only way to resolve the war between Israelis and Palestinians was to implement a one-state solution.

He is a member of the American Political Science Association, the Association for Israel Studies, the Middle East Studies Association, and the Council on Foreign Relations.

Reception of his work
In a 1989 review of his early work the anti-Zionist rabbi Elmer Berger called Lustick a 'first-class Zionist academic', and praised his 'meticulous scholarship'.

In 1988 Lustick published his For the Land and the Lord a study of religious fundamentalism in Israel. It appeared under the imprint of a series of monographs the Council of Foreign Relations considered a 'responsible treatment(s) of a significant international topic worthy of presentation to the public.' In this work, according to Joel Brinkley, he suggested that, were it not for Israel's on-going conflict with its regional neighbours, Israel itself might find itself embroiled in a civil war between the opposing poles of secular forces and fundamentalist religious Zionists. 
Elmer Berger wrote that he knew of 'no better documented source in English for anyone interested in greater understanding of both the parties and the leading representatives of this phenomenon' (of Israeli religious fundamentalism).  At the same time, he argued that Lustick shared shortcomings discernible in the works of Israel's revisionist New Historians in that the territorial expansionism  and racial discrimination documented as recent Zionist trends by the 1980s wave of young Zionist scholars - Lustick charts these traits as bursting into the secular mainstream of Israeli society with the emergence of messianic movements like Gush Emunim in the 1970s -underplayed, minimized or whitewashed tendencies that were intrinsic to Zionism from its pristine beginnings.

In 2019 he came out with a new book Paradigm Lost: From Two-State Solution to One-State Reality  analyzes the origins and implications of the disappearance of the two-state solution. 
George Washington University's Nathan Brown stated in his review that he found the book "accessible, forceful, and concise. Its tone will rub some readers the wrong way but strike others as admirably frank."

Selected publications

State-building failure in British Ireland & French Algeria. Berkeley, Calif. : Institute of International Studies, University of California, Berkeley, c1985. (x, 109 p.)
Israel's Dangerous Fundamentalists, by Ian S. Lustick, in Foreign Policy, Number 68, Fall 1987, pp. 118–139
For the land and the Lord : Jewish fundamentalism in Israel. New York, N.Y. : Council on Foreign Relations, 1988.
Critical essays on Israeli society, politics, and culture, editors Ian S. Lustick and Barry Rubin. Albany : State University of New York Press, c1991. (xi, 204 p.)
Unsettled states, disputed lands : Britain and Ireland, France and Algeria, Israel and the West Bank-Gaza. Ithaca, N.Y. : Cornell University Press, 1993 
Arab-Israeli relations : historical background and origins of the conflict, edited with introductions by Ian S. Lustick. New York : Garland, 1994. (xiii, 409 p.)
Palestinians under Israeli rule, edited with introductions by Ian S. Lustick. New York : Garland, 1994 (xiv, 333 p).
Economic, legal, and demographic dimensions of Arab-Israeli relations, edited, with introductions by Ian S. Lustick. New York : Garland Pub., 1994. (xii, 349 p.)
Arab-Israeli relations in world politics, edited with introductions by Ian S. Lustick. New York : Garland Pub., 1994. (xiii, 345 p.)
The Conflict with the Arabs in Israeli politics and society, edited with introductions by Ian S. Lustick. New York : Garland, 1994. (xi, 369 p.)
The conflict with Israel in Arab politics and society, edited with introductions by Ian S. Lustick. New York : Garland Pub., 1994. (xii, 393 p.)
From war to war : Israel vs. the Arabs, 1948-1967, edited with introductions by Ian S. Lustick. New York : Garland Pub., 1994. (xii, 321 p.)
From wars toward peace in the Arab-Israeli conflict, 1969-1993, edited with introductions by Ian S. Lustick. New York : Garland Pub., 1994. (xiii, 355 p.)
"The absence of Middle Eastern great powers : political "backwardness" in historical perspective", International Organization, 1997 (51):4, pp. 653–683.
"Lijphart, Lakatos, and consociationalism", World Politics, 1997 (50):1, pp. 88–117 
Right-sizing the state : the politics of moving borders, edited by Brendan O'Leary, Ian S. Lustick and Thomas Callaghy. Oxford: Oxford University Press, 2001
Exile and return : predicaments of Palestinians and Jews, edited by Ann M. Lesch and Ian S. Lustick. Philadelphia : University of Pennsylvania Press, c2005.
Trapped in the War on Terror. Philadelphia : University of Pennsylvania Press, 2006. (xii, 186p.)
Paradigm Lost:  From Two-State Solution to One-State Reality. University of Pennsylvania Press, 2019.

See also
Historical institutionalism
www.paradigmlostbook.com

Notes

Citations

Sources

External links
Ian S. Lustick, website at the University of Pennsylvania
[*http://paradigmlostbook.com Ian Lustick]
: Harry Kreisler interviews Ian Lustick 2006 on the War on Terror
: Harry Kreisler interviews Ian Lustick 2002 on Coming to Terms with Israel

1949 births
Living people
American political scientists
University of California, Berkeley alumni
University of Pennsylvania faculty